The 2017 Euroformula Open Championship was a multi-event motor racing championship for single-seat open wheel formula racing cars that held across Europe. The championship will feature drivers competing in two-litre Formula Three racing cars built by Italian constructor Dallara which conform to the technical regulations, or formula, for the championship. It was the fourth Euroformula Open Championship season.

The season was dominated by Harrison Scott, who holds the record for most wins, poles and fastest laps in a rookie season of the Euroformula Open Championship (but he wasn't eligible to the rookie's championship due to his 2016 Masters of Formula 3 experience). He clinched drivers' title at Monza with two rounds to spare and mostly by his race results was granted teams' title to RP Motorsport. Drivex driver Nikita Troitskiy finished as runner-up, losing to Scott by 118 points. Troitkiy won the rookies' championship. Devlin DeFrancesco won race at Circuito de Jerez and completed the top-three in the driver standings. DeFrancesco became the Spanish Formula 3 champion.

Teams and drivers
 All cars were powered by Toyota engines, used Dallara chassis and equipped with Michelin tyres.

Race calendar and results
An eight-round calendar was confirmed on 15 February 2017. All rounds will support the International GT Open, except for Jerez, which will be headlined by both Formula 2 and GP3 Series. Rounds denoted with a blue background are part of the Spanish Formula Three Championship.

Euroformula Open Championship

Drivers' championship
Points were awarded as follows:

Rookies' championship
Points were awarded as follows:

Teams' championship
Points were awarded as follows:

Spanish Formula 3 Championship

Drivers' championship
Points were awarded as follows:

Teams' championship
Points were awarded as follows:

Footnotes

References

External links
 

Euroformula Open Championship seasons
Euroformula Open
Euroformula Open
Euroformula Open